Vassilis Symtsak (alternative spellings: Vasilis, Vasileios, Simtsak) ((born 3 March 1981) is a Greek professional basketball coach and former player. He currently serves as an assistant coach for Panathinaikos of the Greek Basket League and the EuroLeague. Standing at 2.07 m (6 ft 9  in), he mainly played at the center position.

Professional career
Some of the clubs that Symtsak has played with in his pro career include: Doukas, Sporting, AEK Athens, PAOK, Trikala 2000, Kavala, Ikaros Kallitheas, and Panionios. In 2014, he signed with the Greek League club Aris. He then re-signed with Aris in 2015.

After the end of the 2016–17 season, Symtsak completed 10 seasons in the Greek Basket League, counting 1,068 points, 1,095 rebounds, 154 assists, 116 steals, and 43 blocks, in a total of 258 appearances.

On 19 July 2017, Symtsak penned a single-season deal with Greek A2 Basket League club Peristeri B.C. Averaging 6.8 points, 5.5 rebounds and 2.4 assists per game, he helped the club with his experience to celebrate the championship and the return to Greek Basket League after five years.

On July 21, 2022, he signed with Tofaş of the Turkish Basketbol Süper Ligi as an assistant coach. On February 21, 2023, he returned to Panathinaikos as an assistant to Christos Serelis.

Personal life
Symtsak is of mixed Polish and Greek descent. His father is Polish, while his mother originates from a Greek family that found refuge in Poland, after the Greek Civil War.

Awards and accomplishments
2× Greek 2nd Division Champion: (2007, 2018)

References

External links
EuroCup Profile
Champions League Profile
FIBA Europe Profile
Eurobasket.com Profile
Greek Basket League Profile 
Greek Basket League Profile 
AEK Profile
Aris Profile
Twitter 

1981 births
Living people
AEK B.C. players
Aris B.C. players
Basketball players from Athens
BC UNICS coaches
Centers (basketball)
Doukas B.C. players
Greek Basket League players
Greek basketball coaches
Greek expatriate basketball people in Russia
Greek expatriate basketball people in Turkey
Greek men's basketball players
Greek people of Polish descent
Ikaros B.C. players
Kavala B.C. players
Panathinaikos B.C. coaches
Panionios B.C. players
P.A.O.K. BC players
Peristeri B.C. players
Polish people of Greek descent
Power forwards (basketball)
Sporting basketball players
Tofaş S.K. coaches
Trikala B.C. players